Suillellus mendax is a species of bolete fungus found in Europe. It was originally published as a species of Boletus when it was newly described in 2013, but then transferred to Suillellus the following year.

This species is morphologically very similar to the widespread Suillellus luridus, but differs in its predominantly acidophilous ecology, a mostly dull-coloured, finely felty cap and more narrowly ellipsoid to subfusiform spores measuring (12.4–)13.3–14.7(–15.5) × (4.5–)4.9– 5.5(–5.7) μm.

Suillellus mendax forms ectomycorrhizal associations with beech (Fagus), oak (Quercus) and sweet chestnut (Castanea). So far, it has been molecularly verified from Italy, France and the island of Cyprus.

References

External links

mendax
Fungi described in 2013
Fungi of Europe